Feroze Mithiborwala is an Indian activist who devotes his efforts principally to the Israeli–Palestinian conflict, and Western imperialism in Asia. He led a humanitarian convoy that travelled from India to Gaza in the winter of 2010–11.

In his Twitter profile, he describes himself as being “committed to the global struggle against Imperialism & Zionism & thus the freedom of Humanity".

Activist background
Mithiborwala describes himself as being "from the Gandhian, left, Phule-Ambedakarite (the struggle of the oppressed lower and untouchable castes) and the stream of liberation theology".

An active supporter of Palestinian statehood, Mithiborwala has described Gaza as "a Nazi-prison-cum-concentration camp".

He told members of the Islamic Consultative Assembly in December 2010 that the people of the world would join together against an Israeli attack on Iran.

On Jerusalem Day in Mumbai in 2010 he said that Indians needed to increase their solidarity with the Palestinians. He said that the Palestinian resistance was "the international avant garde" and the "central geopolitical issue of our times" in the joint struggle against imperialism and Zionism".

While in Beirut during the 2006 Lebanon War, Mithiborwala wrote a column about what he called Lebanon's "victory".

Gaza convoy
Mithiborwala was a co-organizer of a convoy of 120 people who travelled from India to Gaza in the winter of 2010–11, leaving India on 5 December 2010. Its stated purpose was to deliver humanitarian aid, with Mithiborwala saying: “Since this is the first convoy from Asia to show solidarity with the Palestinian cause, our aim is only to get to Gaza and not confront the Israeli government.” The group included over 50 Indians, and they planned on arriving in Gaza by 28 December.

According to Salim Ghafouri, an Iranian citizen who claims to be the spokesman for the convoy, the participants in the convoy represented 137 organisations from 50 countries, including Japan, Malaysia, Indonesia, Pakistan, Iran, Turkey, Britain, and Australia. Most, however, were Indians. Ghafouri said that the war with "the Zionists" is not only an “Islamic-Zionist war,” but the showdown between the “truth,” represented by “the freedom-loving people of the world,” and the “lie” of Israel and its supporters.

Mithiborwala said that he and his colleagues had four goals: “Liberation of Palestine, breaking the Gaza siege, annihilation of the apartheid system of Israel and unity among the Asian nations, with the slogan, 'One Asia United Asia'. Thus an Asia free of US Imperialism & NATO bases.”

The amount and significance of the aid delivered by the convoy has been the subject of debate. The Indian Express reported that the medical aid carried by the convoy was worth Rs 2.7 million, or about US$50,000. The convoy also donated two ambulances to Palestinian authorities. The Meir Amit Intelligence and Terrorism Information Center said that the amount of aid delivered by the convoy was "negligible". The Milli Gazette, a Muslim newspaper, reported that the convoy took "medical equipment, food items, clothes and other aid worth $1 million, weighing 170 tons, for the people of Gaza who continue to suffer unspeakable hardship for nearly five years under the illegal blockade imposed by the Israeli-US regimes."

During the convoy's sojourn in Iran many contributions were received from Iranians. To process these contributions, the convoy opened dozens of headquarters in larger Iranian cities. Mithiborwala, in an address to the Iranian parliament, called the president of the US "an agent of Israel".

In Syria, the convoy met with exiled Hamas leader Khaled Mashal.

Upon arrival in El Arish, Mithiborwala said that the purpose of the convoy was "to break the siege of the Gaza Strip, to bring about the establishment of an independent Palestinian state whose capital is Jerusalem, and [to cause] the economic and political boycott of Israel."

In a retrospective interview, Mithiborwala said that "we were not there to 'help' the Palestinians. Ours is a movement of 'solidarity' with the people's resistance for the liberation of Palestine ... especially since 2008, we have been trying to organize a ship or a land caravan from India." He said that he planned to march until "Palestine is free. Today we have begun our march to Gaza, but tomorrow we will march to Jerusalem." He believes that when the Palestinians have won the battle for Jerusalem, humanity will be closer to God in a very universal and spiritual sense.

Global March to Jerusalem
The Global March to Jerusalem planned a number of large-scale anti-Israel demonstrations around the Arab world on 30 March 2012, which is Palestine Land Day. The idea was for the participants to gather in various places and then march to Jerusalem, or as far as they could get. Mithiborwala was described as "the key organiser of the Indian leg" of the event. Mithiborwala wrote that the event was not an attempt to delegitimise Israel, saying that "Rather, it is Israel's actions and policies that create its image as a practitioner of ethnic cleansing and an abuser of human rights."

Asked why he and his fellow participants were marching to Jerusalem and not to the Gaza Strip, Mithiborwala said that they were two different questions, citing the Gaza issue as a humanitarian crisis and Jerusalem as a political question as well as a "religious and anti-colonial issue". He went on to say that he considers Iran, Syria, Lebanon as anti-American powers, and South Asian anti-Imperialist parties among their allies.

After returning to Delhi, Mithiborwala said he wanted a unification of the Palestinian movement, and that he wanted Fatah and Hamas to be together. He went on to say that negotiations with Israelis would not solve anything, and that there needs to be a common programme of resistance.

Anti-Brahmanism
Mithiborwala is an anti-caste system activist, and in particular, opposes Manuwad or the supremacist hierarchical ideological system that relegates India's Shudras, Ati Shudras and Adivasis to second class status. He has been inspired by Mahatma Gandhi and is also a leftist and a Phule-Ambedkarite described as "an ideologue" who has been a leftist and also part of the Sarvodaya movement. In his view, noted a profile in the Indian magazine Outlook, "Hindu is not the enemy; casteism is."

After an Indian court upheld the demolition of a mosque, Mithiborwala accused Brahmanic elite forces of trying to subjugate Muslim communities and called the verdict a mockery. He said it "stands in utter contempt of the Indian constitution" and "giv[es] precedence to belief or aastha over law".

Conspiracy theories
Mithiborwala has propounded a number of conspiracy theories. He has claimed that terrorists acts attributed to Muslim groups were in fact "false flag" attacks, "inside jobs" carried out by the Intelligence agencies of the US, Israeli, Indian, Pakistani and/or other governments to discredit Muslims.

Mithiborwala wrote that the Mumbai 26/11 attack was carried out by the CIA and Mossad, its objective being to establish a pro-US/Israeli consensus among Indians, allowing the US/Israeli political elite "to deploy our Military into the war theatre in Afghanistan".

In June 2011 Mithiborwala wrote that David Headley, who was involved with planning the 26/11 attack, was "a CIA-FBI operative whose task was to organize & expedite the Mumbai 26/11 terror attacks."

He wrote that the attacks were the result of a CIA/Saudi Arabian/Mossad conspiracy, saying "The strategic period & the timing of the terror attacks are a pointer to the powers behind the perpetrators."

Mithiborwala believes that Osama bin Laden has been dead since the latter half of December 2001. He expressed his belief that the parties saying he was still alive were doing this because "The ghost of Bin Laden serves multiple purposes both at the Global and Indian context", mainly to generate fear for the Hindu community and to be a "false hero" for Muslims, falsely inspiring youth to follow the "flawed path of extremism and terror".

When several small bombs were set off in Pune on 1 August 2012, Mithiborwala and Kishore Jagtap called them a "Chitpawan Brahmanical-Manuwadi reaction to the restoration of the true Samadhi-Burial Shrine of Saibai, the first wife of Shivaji Maharaj", and thus "part of the ongoing caste war that has once again erupted all across Maharashtra".

After the 21 February 2013 terrorist bombing in Hyderabad, Mithiborwala charged the ruling Indian National Congress party with staging it to win conservative Hindu votes. He claimed the bombing would be blamed on fictitious " 'Sleeper Cells' of disgruntled Muslim youth, who will begin to be picked up from the lanes of this city", and most of whom "will be police informers & petty criminals who will be entrapped into owning up for this terror attack". Both the Pune and Hyderabad bombings were believed to have been carried out by the Indian Mujahideen.

Other activities and organisations
Mithiborwala is president of Awami Bharat, an Indian political group that has described itself as being involved in an "international struggle against imperialism, Zionism, and Brahmanism". He is the founder-convenor of the Muslim Intellectual Forum of India and of the South Asian Solidarity Initiative. He has also been the national vice-president of the Maharashtra-based political party Rashtriya Samaj Paksha (RSP).

Mithiborwala led protests against the India–United States Civil Nuclear Agreement in 2008.

Mithiborwala, in his capacity as coordinator of a group called Forum against War and Terrorism, was involved in planning a 2006 event called "Mumbai in White", which he described as an attempt, after the terrorist acts in that city, "to do something to touch the lives of Mumbaikars in a subtle manner".

Mithiborwala was also part of "an international peace delegation" with members from India, the Philippines, Brazil, Norway, France, and Spain that paid a friendly visit to Hizbollah in Lebanon in 2006. It was reported that they "stressed that it would be wrong to call Hizbollah a 'militant' outfit" and should rather be called a "socio-political resistance movement". Mithiborwala was quoted as stating that "Even a child in Lebanon wants to be a part of Hizbollah."

Mithiborwala signed a letter opposing the NATO-led 2011 military intervention in Libya.

Detention in Mumbai
Mithiborwala and his friend Kishor Jagtap were both pre-emptively detained before Secretary of State Clinton's visit to Mumbai in 2009. This action might have been in connection to his demand for an investigation into US Government cover ups in the Headley affair, where even the mainstream media has raised questions regarding the coverup. He described being picked up from his house on a Friday night without a specific reason given and then being brought into the MIDC police station. He spoke of the experience: “An official told us that we had been brought owing to an intelligence input and will be here till the next day. However, on Saturday, they told us that we would be allowed to leave only on Sunday. While Clinton's visit or security has not been mentioned to us as the reason for our detention, we sat there for very long without even knowing why.”

References

Indian secularists
Living people
People of the Israeli–Palestinian conflict
Indian humanitarians
Year of birth missing (living people)